Amélie Mesureur (née de Wailly; March 3, 1853 – December 7, 1926, in Paris) was a French poet and novelist, best remembered for her Montyon Prize winning novel Histoire d'un enfant de Paris (1870/71). She was made a knight of the Legion of Honour in 1921.

References 

1853 births
1926 deaths
French poets
French novelists